Brentwood School is an independent, secular K–12 coed day school with two campuses located four blocks apart in the Brentwood neighborhood of Los Angeles, California, United States.

History
Founded in 1972, Brentwood School took over the property formerly owned by Brentwood Military Academy, which had existed at this location since 1930. The Academy, founded by Mary McDonnell in 1902, moved sites multiple times, and was always under the direction of Miss McDonnell and other family members. In spring 1972, it was announced that the military academy would not reopen in the fall, and the property was sold by John McDonnell to Terry Leavey Lemons and Walter Ziglar, who soon converted the school to non-profit status. Brentwood School opened in fall 1972 as a college preparatory day school serving Grades 6-10. The first Headmaster of Brentwood School was Richman Grant. Grade 11 was added in 1973, and the school graduated its first Senior class in June 1975. After that, the school remained Grades 7-12 until 1995 when, under the guidance of Headmaster Hunter M. Temple, Brentwood School purchased the Marymount Junior School campus and opened the Lower Division. With the opening of the Lower Division in fall 1995, the school became Grades K-6 on the West Campus and Grades 7-12 on the East Campus. In 2001 the 22 acre (89,000 m²) Brentwood School Athletics Complex opened on the East Campus. On December 2, 2011, four new modular classrooms were installed by Gen7 at Brentwood School's East Campus. The classrooms, LEED Gold certified, provide 100% of their own energy, making them the first zero net energy classrooms in Los Angeles County. In the fall of 2019, Brentwood School opened a brand new Middle School building allowing its 6th Grade to join the Middle School from the Lower School, and increase enrollment size for each grade on both campuses. 

Walter Ziglar and Terry Leavey Lemons are credited as founders of the school. For the first 5 years, Ziglar served as the President. He was also the Chair of the first Board of Executive Directors, which included Bill Badham of Curtis School and Vern Simpson of Montclair Prep.

Overview

Combined enrollment on both campuses is about 1200 students – roughly 900 on the East Campus and 300 on the West Campus. For the 2021-2022 school year, tuition without Financial Support in the Lower School was listed as $39,350 per year, while tuition in the Middle and Upper Schools were listed at $46,550 per year. The school awards approximately $3,500,000 in need-based financial support each year. Brentwood is a highly selective school, with major admissions entry points in kindergarten, 6th, 7th, and 9th grades, and only limited openings at other grade levels. Admissions decisions are made by a committee composed of faculty and administrators. Brentwood offers a liberal arts curriculum, including over 100 courses each year, including advanced placement courses in 17 subject areas. The school year runs from August 31 to June 10.

Diversity
The Brentwood School community includes students who live in nearly 120 different zip codes and come from over 220 different schools. 19% of Brentwood School families benefit from financial support. As of 2021, both the West Campus (Grades K-5) and the East Campus (Grades 6-12) reported that their student community consists of 46% students of color. In 2016, Brentwood School created its Office of Equity and Inclusion, and hired Trina Moore-Southall as the school's first Director of Equity and Inclusion. Brentwood School has a Diversity Council composed of faculty, staff and administrative representatives who are directly involved in change-based work within the school community. Members of the council are committed to ongoing personal growth and development in areas including, but not limited to, an anti-bias curriculum and thought; cultural and racial literacy; intercultural intelligence; social awareness and social justice. Members of the council are actively and visibly supportive of campus programs and events.

On May 18, 2016, former Major League Baseball player Barry Bonds, whose daughter attended the school, expressed racism outrage over white students using the "n-word" while rapping to a popular ASAP Ferg song. The incident spurred a Change.org petition calling for action.

Athletics
During any given school year, Brentwood School fields 83 different athletic teams in grades 4-12. Brentwood School Upper School fields 35 teams in 17 different sports. Brentwood School's all-encompassing in-house resources support athletes in an inclusive way, offering not only coaching on the field or court, but also strength and conditioning, mental performance, athletic training, college recruiting, and top-notch athletic apparel and equipment through our Nike sponsorship. Students fill about 500 roster spots and work with more than 80 coaches. Approximately 80% of Brentwood’s students will participate in at least one interscholastic sport. The school primarily employs its own teachers as coaches, and requires that students maintain a certain degree of academic standing in order to participate in sports. Brentwood School has a history of hosting the annual Special Olympics Games put on in conjunction with the Special Olympics Southern California Westside Chapter. In 2003, Brentwood-area resident (and former Governor of California) Arnold Schwarzenegger was the Guest of Honor and presided over the Special Olympics Games' Opening Ceremony. Since 1992, the School has also provided a venue for the Peter Vidmar Men's Gymnastics Invitational, hosted by former U.S Gold-Medal winning Olympian and Brentwood School alumnus, Peter Vidmar. Brentwood School also has a wide variety of e-sports teams - created to expand the school's athletic views.

Relation to Olympics

Brentwood School track and cross-country coaches Joanna Hayes and Malachi Davis participated in 2004 Summer Olympics in Athens, Greece. Joanna Hayes was a Gold-Medalist in the Women's 100 metres hurdles competition for the United States. Davis was a participant in the Men's 4x400 metres relay for Great Britain. Jason Rogers, a Brentwood School alumnus as well as an Ohio State graduate, was a participant in the 2004 Olympic Games, as a Sabre Fencer for the United States National team. He was part of the 2008 team in the Beijing Olympics and won a Silver Medal in the Team tournament for Sabre. Peter Vidmar, who led the United States to a Gold-medal in Men's Gymnastics at the 1984 Summer Olympics in Los Angeles, California, is also a Brentwood School alumnus, and was a member of the Board of Trustees for several years. Most recently Ezra Frech, competed in the 2020 Paralympics for Team USA, placing 5th in high jump, and 8th in long jump.

Casey Wasserman who attended Brentwood School led Los Angeles' successful bid for the 2028 Summer Olympics and Paralympic Games and is serving as the head of the organizing committee for the event.

Relationship with the Veteran's Administration
Since 1972, Brentwood School has supported the Veteran's Administration and veterans through school engagement that includes direct services and student engagement. In 2016, Brentwood School formalized its on-going relationship with a significant commitment to the VA valued at closed to $1.8 million annually in rent and in-kind services. This partnership specifically benefits veterans and their families, supports the VA in the achievement of its master plan goals, and enriches the lives of Brentwood students. 

On August 29, 2013, U.S. District Judge S. James Otero responding to a lawsuit by the ACLU, ruled that the West Los Angeles Veterans' Administration Enhanced Sharing Agreements that allowed VA land to be leased to Brentwood School, UCLA, and other businesses were not valid As of the start of the 2014-2015 school year, the ruling that the VA must terminate those leases was under appeal to the 9th Circuit Court of Appeals.

The 22-acre athletic complex, built by Brentwood School on VA land, is a shared space known as the VCRE (Veterans Center for Recreation and Education). In addition to being home to Brentwood School athletics, it offers extensive recreational, vocational, educational, and wellness opportunities to veterans and their families. Examples of ways in which the connection is deepened and strengthened each year include the following:
Meals for Veterans: 43,986
Donated Items L: 4,696
Student Service Hours: 2,000
Bags of Food: 1,800
VCRE Veteran Members: 998
Veterans to Brentwood School: 500
Summer at Brentwood Scholarships: 168
Veterans Housed: 0

Notable alumni

Andrew Breitbart - American journalist and media executive
Don Diamont - Actor
David Forst - baseball executive
Emily Frances - Former news anchor
Talita von Fürstenberg - fashion designer
Jennifer Grant - Actress
Jonah Hill - Actor, attended Brentwood School, but later transferred to Crossroads School.
Jack Quaid - Actor
Kimberly Ovitz - Fashion designer
Tra Holder - Basketball player
Ryan Kavanaugh - Businessman and film producer
Simon Kinberg - Writer and producer
Jennifer Landon - Actress
Jon Landau - Producer of Titanic and Avatar
Maroon 5, members including Adam Levine, Jesse Carmichael, Mickey Madden, and former member Ryan Dusick - attended Brentwood School while forming the band Kara's Flowers which would later evolve into Maroon 5.
Sidney Miller - Music producer
Lorraine Nicholson - Actress
Antoinette Nwandu - Award winning playwright
John O'Brien, a soccer player for MLS team Chivas USA (formerly of Ajax Amsterdam in the Dutch Eredivisie), and on the US national team, attended Brentwood for two years before leaving for Holland.
Jason Rogers - Olympic medalist
Fred Savage - Actor and director
Ben Savage - Actor
Katherine Schwarzenegger - Author
Patrick Schwarzenegger - Model, actor
Azura Skye - Actress, attended Brentwood but later transferred
Molly Stanton - Actress
Katy Tur - Broadcast journalist
Two Friends - DJ/producer duo made up of Eli Sones and Matt Halper
Peter Vidmar - Olympic medalist
Casey Wasserman - Entertainment executive and President of the Los Angeles 2028 Olympic Organizing Committee

Accreditation
Brentwood School is accredited by the Western Association of Schools and Colleges and the California Association of Independent Schools, and is a member of the following organizations:
National Association of Independent Schools
California Association of Independent Schools
A Better Chance
Independent School Alliance for Minority Affairs
INDEX
Private School Village
Private School Axis
Young Eisner Scholars

References

External links

Educational institutions established in 1972
Defunct United States military academies
High schools in Los Angeles
Private K-12 schools in Los Angeles County, California
Preparatory schools in California
Brentwood, Los Angeles
1972 establishments in California